Highbanks Metro Park is a metropolitan park in Central Ohio, owned and operated by Columbus and Franklin County Metro Parks. The park is named for its steep banks along the Olentangy River, the park's most unique feature. Highbanks also features ten trails, picnic space, a nature center, sledding hill, and nature preserve. It also includes numerous ancient burial mounds and earthworks from the indigenous Adena culture.

The park was established in 1973, and named a National Natural Landmark seven years later. In 2017, the park's River Bluff Area opened to the public.

Attributes
The park is located in northern Franklin County and southern Delaware County, within several townships. It is beside U.S. Route 23 and near Lewis Center, an unincorporated community.

Highbanks Metro Park is the most visited in the Columbus and Franklin County Metro Parks system. It has about 1 million visitors per year.

The bluffs are made up of limestone, Ohio black shale, and Olentangy shale. An observation deck lets visitors look out across the ravine, something pre-Columbian natives were known to do to keep a lookout.

Within the park is a large nature center, a sledding hill, a natural play area, Adena culture mounds, and the  Edward F. Hutchins State Nature Preserve. Highbanks has ten trails, ranging from 0.3 miles to 3.5 miles. Several are paved, while others have grass, gravel, or dirt paths.

Two earthworks located in the park, the Highbanks Metropolitan Park Mounds I and II and the Highbank Park Works, are listed on the National Register of Historic Places.

The park also includes a small graveyard. A portion of the park property was home to Joseph and Sally Pool, a pioneer family that moved there in 1812, and had 13 children. The family's original burial site is lost, though their headstones were found stacked off-site, and recreated within the park. The graveyard is the last known pioneer family graveyard in Sharon Township.

Natural features
Highbanks is home to two nesting bald eagles, a pair that have hatched eaglets since 2010. The park also features two large sycamore trees; the trees are 2324 feet in circumference, and reportedly 500 years old. Many other trees are of mature ages, about 150 years, including oaks, maples, hickories, and beech trees.

Highbanks has unique geological features, including concretions in some riverbeds, sometimes with fossils inside. Some rocks in the park date to 350 million years. Deep ravines there date to 10,000 years, carved by glacial meltwater.

History
The site of the park had numerous ancient burial mounds. The park opened September 22, 1973. Highbanks was designated as a National Natural Landmark in 1980.

In 2017, the park's River Bluff Area opened.

See also
 List of National Natural Landmarks in Ohio

References

External links

 
 A Cultural History of Highbanks Metro Park

Parks in Ohio
1973 establishments in Ohio
Parks established in 1973
Protected areas of Franklin County, Ohio
Protected areas of Delaware County, Ohio
National Natural Landmarks in Ohio
Nature centers in Ohio